This is a list of commanders of the 82nd Airborne Division of the United States Army. The 82nd Airborne Division is one of the oldest divisions in the U.S. Army, having been raised shortly after the American entry into World War I in April 1917 and seeing service in World War I and World War II and many subsequent conflicts.

 Major General Eben Swift 25 August – 23 November 1917
 Brigadier General James Brailsford Erwin 24 November – 16 December 1917
 Brigadier General William P. Burnham 27 December 1917 – 3 October 1918
 Major General George B. Duncan 4 October 1918 – 21 May 1919
 Major General Omar N. Bradley 23 March – 25 June 1942
 Major General Matthew B. Ridgway 26 June 1942 – 27 August 1944
 Major General James M. Gavin 28 August 1944 – 26 March 1948
 Major General Clovis E. Byers 27 March 1948 – 18 July 1949
 Brigadier General Ridgely Gaither 19 July – 31 October 1949
 Major General Williston B. Palmer 1 November 1949 – 15 October 1950
 Major General Thomas F. Hickey 16 October 1950 – 31 January 1952
 Major General Charles D. W. Canham 1 February 1952 – 29 September 1952
 Major General Gerald J. Higgins 20 September 1952 – 14 September 1953
 Major General Francis W. Farrell 6 October 1953 – 4 July 1955
 Major General Thomas Trapnell 5 July – 13 September 1956
 Major General John W. Bowen 14 September 1956 – 27 December 1957
 Major General Hamilton H. Howze 2 January 1958 – 13 June 1959
 Major General Dwight E. Beach 1 July 1959 – 21 April 1961
 Major General Theodore J. Conway 22 April 1961 – 6 July 1962
 Major General John L. Throckmorton 7 July 1962 – 1 February 1964
 Major General Robert H. York 24 February 1964 – 15 July 1965
 Major General Joe S. Lawrie 2 August 1965 – 14 April 1967
 Major General Richard J. Seitz 15 April 1967 – 12 October 1968
 Major General John R. Deane, Jr. 14 October 1968 – 14 July 1970
 Major General George S. Blanchard 15 July 1970 – 16 July 1972
 Major General Frederick J. Kroesen 17 July 1972 – 7 October 1974
 Major General Thomas Tackaberry 8 October 1974 – 11 October 1976
 Major General Roscoe Robinson Jr. 11 October 1976 – 1 December 1978
 Major General Guy S. Meloy III 1 December 1978 – 6 February 1981
 Major General James J. Lindsay 6 February 1981 – 24 June 1983
 Major General Edward Trobaugh 24 June 1983 – 19 June 1985
 Major General Bobby B. Porter 19 June 1985 – 10 January 1986
 Major General John W. Foss 10 January 1986 – 10 October 1986
 Brigadier General Raphael J. Hallada 10 October 1986 – 5 January 1987
 Major General Carl W. Stiner 5 January 1987 – 11 October 1988
 Major General James H. Johnson 11 October 1988 – 29 May 1991
 Major General Henry H. Shelton 29 May 1991 – 21 May 1993
 Major General William M. Steele 21 May 1993 – 10 March 1995
 Major General George A. Crocker 10 March 1995 – 27 November 1996
 Major General Joseph K. Kellogg, Jr. 27 November 1996 – 31 July 1998
 Major General Dan K. McNeill 31 July 1998 – 19 June 2000
 Major General John Vines August 2000 – October 2002
 Major General Charles Swannack October 2002 – 27 May 2004
 Major General William B. Caldwell IV 27 May 2004 – 7 April 2006
 Major General David M. Rodriguez 7 April 2006 – 21 July 2008
 Major General Curtis Scaparrotti 21 July 2008 – 5 August 2010
 Major General James L. Huggins 5 August 2010 – 5 October 2012
 Major General John W. Nicholson Jr. 5 October 2012 – 7 October 2014
 Major General Richard D. Clarke Jr. 7 October 2014 – 2 August 2016
 Major General Michael E. Kurilla 2 August 2016 – 2 August 2018
 Major General James J. Mingus 2 August 2018 – 10 July 2020
 Major General Christopher T. Donahue 10 July 2020 – 10 March 2022
 Major General Christopher C. LaNeve 10 March 2022 – present

References 

Lists of United States military unit commanders
United States Army officers
Infantry divisions of the United States Army